Daddy Cool is a 2009 Indian Malayalam-language action film starring Mammootty, Dhananjay, Richa Pallod, Daniel Balaji and Biju Menon in the lead roles. The film was the directorial debut of Aashiq Abu. The film commenced its shooting in December 2008. The locations were Cochin and Hong Kong.

The movie was released on August 7 2009 worldwide got mixed reviews.

Plot 
The story line of the film is the escapades of a cricket crazy kid, all of eight years and his father, a cop. Antony Simon is a crime branch CI, but prefers to spend his time fooling around with his son Aadi. And being a Crime Branch police officer, his rather laid-back attitude is not appreciated by his peers and superiors. Annie his wife finds this irritating.

The father-son duo becomes friends with the famous national cricketer Sreekanth when they save him from some street fight. Once while the father-son duo was out for shopping, Aadi saw a man with the gun and screams at his father. Simon turns back and shoots him, but he kills the wrong person. Antony now faces murder charges and is suspended from duty.

Later that day, Aadhi is found missing. Antony being a cop, the entire police force in the district is in search. They find that Shakthi, the one who was killed by Simon was the younger brother of Shiva the leader of a gang who were trying to get Sreekanth into a match-fixing deal and from whom Antony saved Sreekanth once. They are trying to get revenge on Simon for killing Shakthi and that's why they abducted Aadi. The rest of the film is about how Simon fights Shiva and his gang and gets Aadhi back from them with brave ways.

Cast

Mammootty as CI Antony Simon 
Dhananjay as Adi Simon
Biju Menon as Roy
Richa Pallod as Annie Simon
Daniel Balaji as Shiva
Ashish Vidyarthi as Bheem Bhai
Vijayaraghavan as DYSP Varghese
Sai Kumar as Shiva Prasad
Baburaj as Soman
Vinayakan as Shelvam, Shiva's henchman
Govind Padmasoorya as Sreekanth, a cricketer
Anoop Chandran as Kappal Basheer
Rajan P. Dev as Roy's father
P. Sreekumar as Annie's father
 Ambika Mohan as Annie's mother
Radhika as Annie's sister
Babu Swamy
Gopakumar
Suraj Venjaramood as Ainkutty (cameo appearance)
Lena Kumar as Adi's class teacher (cameo appearance)
Bipin Chandran as The News Reader (cameo appearance)
Nikita Thukral as item number in the song "Saamba Salsa".

Production
The role of a cricketer was first offered to S. Sreesanth before it was given to Govind Padmasoorya.

Soundtrack
The film features a soundtrack, consisting of 6 songs, composed by Bijibal.

Reception
Sify rated the film 3/5 and noted that "In all fairness, Daddy Cool is meant to be a visual spectacle not to be taken with much seriousness. In the current form, it leaves you just cold or to a great extent, let down!". Paresh C. Palicha of Rediff rated the film 1.5/5 and opined that "Malayalam film Daddy Cool directed by newcomer Aashiq Abu is one more substandard film of Mammootty to hit the theatres in the recent times after Ee Pattanathil Bhootham".

References

External links
 
 

2009 films
2000s Malayalam-language films
Films about child abduction in India
Films about families
Films about murder
Indian police films
Films shot in Kochi
Films shot in Hong Kong
Fictional portrayals of the Kerala Police
Indian films about revenge
Films directed by Aashiq Abu
2009 directorial debut films